Nipponocis is a genus of tree-fungus beetles in the family Ciidae.

Species
 Nipponocis ashuensis Nobuchi, 1959
 Nipponocis longisetosus Nobuchi, 1955
 Nipponocis magnus Nobuchi, 1955
 Nipponocis unipunctatus Nakane & Nobuchi, 1956

References

Ciidae genera